Keith William MacLellan (1920–29 September 1998) was a soldier, scholar and Canadian diplomat who helped to shape Canada's post war multi-lateral foreign policy and championed the cause of a federal, united, Canada.

Life and family 

Of Canadian pioneering stock, Keith MacLellan was born on 30 November 1920 in Aylmer, Quebec, the son of William David MacLellan and Edith Olmsted.  He was a direct descendant of Philemon Wright, the founder of Hull, Quebec now called Gatineau.

He grew up in Montreal and first studied at McGill University where in 1942 he helped John Sutherland and his sister found the First Statement, a Canadian literary anthology.

He subsequently joined the army and served during World War II as one of only two Canadians in the British Special Air Service (1st SAS), where he operated behind German lines.  It was in this period that he first met and then married on 11 September 1946, his wife, Comtesse Marie Antoinette LeGrelle, daughter of  Comte Adelin Le Grelle and Rosalie de Swert, from Antwerp, Belgium; whose uncle, Comte Jacques Legrelle (aka "Jérôme"), helped to organise and run the Comet (or Comète) Line, which was Europe's largest and most successful underground escape line during World War II; and whose niece, Cécilia Ciganer-Albéniz became First Lady of France in 2007.

Post war, he read Philosophy, Politics and Economics at New College, Oxford, obtaining his MA in 1947.  In this time, he both rowed for his college and was a contemporary with political and literary figures such as Tony Wedgewood Benn and the organisers of the Oxford Manifesto of 1947.

He subsequently returned to Canada, first working at Imperial Oil and then joining Canada's Department of External Affairs as a diplomat in 1950. It was as a Canadian diplomat that he represented his country around the world and helped to shape Canada's foreign policy in Asia, Europe and the Middle East. He rose to the rank of ambassador before leaving in order to pursue a career in politics, first standing for parliament as a Conservative Candidate in the riding of Lasalle in 1979 and then again in 1988 in Westmount St Henri.

Despite not being elected to Parliament, Keith MacLellan did not abandon his love of politics, but rather devoted his later years to the twin causes of Canadian/Quebec unity and Scottish/Clan MacLellan history.  He was first elected as president of the St. Andrew's Society of Montreal and later President of the St Andrew's Society of Ottawa. He was Director, Clan MacLellan of America and a convenor of the Franco-Scottish society of Québec.  In each case, he was able to use his political skills not only to weld the often warring factions into a cohesive whole, but also to instil into proceedings the higher ideal of using Scottish history within Quebec as a force for Canadian unity.

He is survived by his four children, Dr Keith MacLellan, Dr Anne-Marie MacLellan, Janet MacLellan and Andrew MacLellan.

War years 

Like many of his generation, his studies were interrupted by the war and he joined the Royal Montreal Regiment, with whom he trained, was commissioned as an officer and was sent to the United Kingdom.

It was in the United Kingdom that he transferred to the 1st Special Air Service (1st SAS), becoming one of only two Canadians serving in the 1st SAS during the war.  In this time, he was part of small jeep mounted units that operated behind enemy lines in Belgium, the Netherlands, Germany and Norway.

While his precise involvement in operations is unknown, it is known that:
 he joined "A Sqn" 1st SAS in 1944.
 he was detached for a short period (Dec 1944-Jan 1945) for either or both Operation Franklin and Operation Regent during the Battle of the Bulge where he was part of a group sent to hunt the SS-Obersturmbannführer Otto Skorzeny's commandos.
 he returned to his squadron and took part in Operation Archway (March–May 1945) where his unit operated behind the German lines first in support of the Rhine Crossing, and subsequently in advance of the Allied armies, finally reaching Keil in May 1945.
 he took part in Operation Apostle, (May–August 1945) in Norway, where the SAS were deployed to disarm some 300,000 German soldiers at the end of the war.

It is also known that he was part of the SAS detachment that first liberated the Bergen Belsen concentration camp, which his unit discovered while operating ahead of the allied armies after the Rhine crossing.

It was during the liberation of Antwerp in 1944, that he first met Comtesse Marie Antoinette LeGrelle whom he married after the war as a student at Oxford.

External Affairs 

Keith MacLellan joined External Affairs in 1950 and was part of the small group of Canadian Foreign Service officers who helped to shape Canada's post war diplomatic efforts and policy in a critical time in Canada's history.

This group, led by their political masters, shaped and represented a Canadian foreign policy and identity on the world stage that was neither American nor British, yet was, within the constraints of the Cold War, both allied with, yet independent to, all. The group's ethos of "multilateralism" successfully defined Canada's separate identity while enabling it to exert its influence through multilateral institutions based on the rule of law such as the United Nations and the World Health Organization.

MacLellan's career covered a number of countries that were undergoing "interesting times", most notably: Laos in 1965–1966 when it was in some turmoil, including the Civil War, as a result of the conflict in neighbouring Vietnam; Pakistan in 1974–1977 when the then Prime Minister Zulfikar Ali Bhutto was deposed; and in Afghanistan, in the same period, when a series of coups eventually led to the Soviet invasion. Finally, he witnessed the beginning of the unravelling of Yugoslavia in 1979 when President Josip Broz Tito's illness, and subsequent death in 1980, was creating a power vacuum that would end in ethnic divisions and civil war.

It was perhaps in these countries and times that his character and military background came to the fore, as he often eschewed the closed confines of the diplomatic compound in favour of prolonged "fishing trips" in remote provinces where foreigners were rarely seen, but coincidentally, political unrest was simmering.

Negotiating A Nuclear Non-Proliferation Treaty with Pakistan

It was however in Pakistan that Keith MacLellan faced his greatest diplomatic challenge, namely to try to get Pakistan and its then Prime Minister Zulfikar Ali Bhutto to sign up to the Nuclear Non-Proliferation Treaty and abandon its aim of manufacturing a nuclear bomb in response to India having exploded their own device, Smiling Buddha, on 18 May 1974.

Canada had what was believed at the time to be a trump card in the international effort to curb Pakistan's ambitions; namely the supply of uranium and technical support to Pakistan's Canadian manufactured KANUPP nuclear power plant.  KANUPP was believed at the time to be Pakistan's only source of fissile material from which a bomb could be made.  At the same time, matters were complicated by France agreeing to sell Pakistan a nuclear fuel reprocessing plant and technical expertise which would have the capability of turning the "spent fuel" from KANUPP into large quantities of weapons grade plutonium.

While inconceivable in this day and age of instant communications and "special envoy" shuttle diplomacy, the task of bringing Prime Minister Bhutto to the negotiating table and obtaining an agreement fell on Keith MacLellan as Canada's representative in Pakistan.

Unfortunately, both Canada and the West had seriously underestimated Bhutto's determination to develop Pakistan's own bomb and the sacrifices that it was prepared to pay in order to do so. In fact, unknown to them, Bhutto had formally launched Pakistan's nuclear programme within 3 months of being elected Prime Minister in 1972 and subsequently accelerated the programme in 1974 by launching Project-706, which was later described by Time Magazine as "Pakistan's equivalent of the U.S.'s Manhattan Project" .  Part of this project involved developing the technology and expertise to produce and refine uranium from other sources than Canada.

As a result, the threat of Canadian sanctions on the KANNUP reactor were less of an ultimate deterrent than was believed at the time.  Consequently, negotiations between Keith MacLellan and Prime Minister Bhutto finally broke down in 1976 and despite a State Visit to Ottawa by Bhutto, Canada withdrew its support for the reactor. This action however only resulted in a delay rather than a cessation of Pakistan's nuclear programme.

While accounts vary as to the length of the delay before Canadian uranium and expertise were replaced by domestic product, with some sources stating that the impact as little as two years, prior to the sanction Pakistan had initially projected having a working device by the early-mid 1980s, whereas it actually only detonated its first device in 1998 .

Postings Abroad
Keith MacLellan represented his country in the following locations:

Political Interlude 

As a career diplomat who had spent most of his life serving Canadian interests in countries torn apart by sectarian divides, Keith MacLellan viewed the proposed separation of Quebec from the rest of Canada as being the most important challenge that Canada had faced in its history.

Responding to this challenge was, he felt, a "call of duty" that could not be ignored. As a result, despite holding the post of Canadian Ambassador to Yugoslavia and Bulgaria, he formally asked for "leave of absence" in 1979 from External Affairs in order to stand for Parliament and help with the 1980 Quebec Referendum. When this permission was refused, he resigned from External Affairs, thus effectively ending his career. He returned to his native Montreal to stand as Conservative Party candidate in the riding of Lasalle, a Liberal Party stronghold, and also to help to mobilise the Federalist "No" vote in Quebec.

He was defeated in the election to Parliament by a sound margin, but the referendum on whether Quebec should pursue a path toward sovereignty and eventual secession from Canada was also defeated.

He subsequently reapplied to rejoin External Affairs, where after a time of wearing "sackcloth and ashes" in Ottawa, he was posted as Ambassador to first Jordan and then to Syria before formally retiring in 1985.

Post external affairs
MacLellan left external affairs in order to pursue a career in politics, first standing for parliament as a Conservative Candidate in the riding of Lasalle in 1979 and then again in 1988 in Westmount St Henri.

References 

Alumni of New College, Oxford
McGill University alumni
People from Gatineau
Special Air Service officers
1920 births
1997 deaths
Canadian people of World War II
Ambassadors of Canada to Syria
Ambassadors of Canada to Jordan
Ambassadors of Canada to Yugoslavia
Ambassadors of Canada to Bulgaria
Ambassadors of Canada to Afghanistan
High Commissioners of Canada to Pakistan
Canadian expatriates in the United Kingdom
Canadian expatriates in the United States
Canadian expatriates in Laos
Canadian expatriates in Switzerland
Canadian expatriates in Italy
Canadian expatriates in Belgium